Verminators is an American reality television series. It is produced by Original Productions of Burbank, California and broadcast in the United States on Discovery Channel, Canada on Discovery Channel (Canada) and the UK on Virgin1. The program follows the employees of the Los Angeles-based pest control company ISOTech as they rid homes and businesses of rodents, cockroaches, termites, spiders, birds and other pests. The series began its run throughout North America on Discovery Channel in April 2008.

A second season began airing in July 2009.  It involves Masterson and the ISOTech crew, along with new recruits and associates, having traveled to Florida; ridding considered residents there of both typical and exotic pests that can be expected of a subtropical environment.

Synopsis 
Mike Masterson, along with his pest control team, ISOTech, take on various challenges involving ridding their clients' homes, apartments, or businesses of recognized pests.

Episodes

Season 1

Season 2

Home media 
The complete first season was released on DVD by Topics Entertainment on August 10, 2010 in the United States and Canada. The 4-disc region 1 set titled, Verminators: Extreme Extermination, contained all 13 aired episodes. The season also became available in the United States on Amazon Video.

The second season, however, never received a DVD release. It is only available via digital download through Amazon Video in the United States and iTunes in Canada.

Soundtrack 
All songs written and composed by Jonathan Miller.

See also 
 Dirty Jobs
 Billy the Exterminator

Notes

External links 

 Official websites
 Verminators at Discovery Channel
 Verminators at Discovery Channel (Canada)   
 Verminators at Original Productions

 Non-official websites
 
 

 Other notable websites
 ISOTech Pest Management

2000s American reality television series
2008 American television series debuts
2009 American television series endings
Discovery Channel original programming
Documentary television series about industry
Nature educational television series
Television series by Original Productions